Petalostylis labicheoides, the butterfly bush, is an erect shrub up to 3 metres tall found in dry areas of Australia. The habitat includes dune fields, creek beds, rocky ridges and sand plains. Flowering occurs in spring.

References

Flora of New South Wales
Flora of Queensland
Flora of Western Australia
Flora of South Australia
Flora of the Northern Territory
Dialioideae